The 2005 FIA GT Magny-Cours Supercar 500 was the second race for the 2005 FIA GT Championship season.  It took place on 1 May 2005 at the Circuit de Nevers Magny-Cours. It was also the second round of the 2005 British GT Championship, counting for the GT2 class only.

Official results

Class winners in bold.  Cars failing to complete 70% of winner's distance marked as Not Classified (NC).
Entries in italic scored points for the British GT Championship.

Statistics
 Pole Position - #17 Russian Age Racing - 1:36.580
 Fastest Lap - #15 JMB Racing - 1:38.826
 Average Speed - 151.72 km/h

External links
 Official Results
 Race results

M
FIA GT
FIA GT Magny-Cours Supercar 500